Terry Martin is chief executive of United Kingdom-based publishers The House of Murky Depths who published the award-winning (British Fantasy Award) quarterly science fiction and horror anthology Murky Depths, and other comics and paperback books. Also the imprint Murkee, publishing children's and YA books.

Martin (based in Lincolnshire) is also a writer, poet and artist. He has published a short story collection called Probably Maybe Perhaps.

Publications
 Dice – Defunct tabletop wargames magazine
 Random Factor – Defunct tabletop wargames magazine (co-edited with Kevin Tucker)
 Born To Dye – Defunct Paintball fanzine
 Murky Depths – The Quarterly Anthology of Graphically Dark Speculative Fiction – 18 issues from 2007 to 2011
 Death and The Maiden, Episode No. 4 by Richard Calder – 28-page full colour comic
 Death and The Maiden, Episode No. 5 by Richard Calder – 28-page full colour comic
 Killing Kiss, by Sam Stone – Paperback novel
 Futile Flame, by Sam Stone – Paperback novel
 Demon Dance, by Sam Stone – Paperback novel
 Hateful Heart, by Sam Stone – Paperback novel
 Silent Sand, by Sam Stone – Paperback novel
 A Glimpse of Hell, a graphic novel by Luke Cooper
 Halo Slipping – Mengele's Brain, a graphic novelette by Luke Cooper
 Shadowraith, a graphic novelette by Nicholas Dishington
 Dead Girls, Act 1 – The Last of England by Richard Calder and Leonardo M Giron 48-page full colour limited edition graphic novel
 Dead Girls No. 1 – Born To Run by Richard Calder and Leonardo M Giron part of 8-comic series
 Dead Girls No. 2 – Little Miss Strange by Richard Calder and Leonardo M Giron part of 8-comic series
 Dead Girls No. 3 – Helter Skelter by Richard Calder and Leonardo M Giron part of 8-comic series
 Going to the Moon by Lavie Tidhar and Paul McCaffrey
 Probably Maybe Perhaps (A collection of near and future short stories), by Terry Martin – Paperback

Bibliography
Fiction
 Sam – Fiction, Issue No. 1 (2007)
 The Shed – Alternate Species (2002)
 The Look – Dangerous Creatures, Issue No. 15 (2003)
 Probably Maybe Perhaps – A collection of near and future short stories, Paperback (2012)

NonFiction
 Monthly column for United Kingdom Paintball Sports Federation UKPSF – Paintball Games International
 Writer/Editor on The Paintball Word (UKPSF members' magazine)

External links 
 Murky Depths
 The House of Murky Depths page
 Terry Martin's home page

Interviews
 Ecstatic Days Interview
 UKSF Book News Interview
 popthought.com Interview

Year of birth missing (living people)
Living people
British publishers (people)